Derby City Rovers were an American semi-professional soccer team based in Louisville, Kentucky, United States. Derby City was also known for their elite-level youth teams that played in local, state, regional and national leagues. Founded in 2010 as the River City Rovers, the team played in USL League Two, the fourth tier of the American Soccer Pyramid.

The team played its home games at the King Louie's Sports Complex located in Louisville. The team's colors were blue, white and gold.

History
River City Rovers was announced as a USL Premier Development League expansion franchise on November 18, 2010. They played their first competitive game on May 19, 2011, a 0–0 tie with fellow expansion team Akron Summit Assault. In May 2014, the club became the Derby City Rovers. Derby City Rovers PDL and Youth Academy ceased operations in July 2018 and there are no plans to return to the pitch.

Year-by-year

 * Although Rovers qualified for post season play, they ceded the match that was to be played July 17, 2012 to Forest City London.

Head coaches

  Tyrone Marshall (2014)
 Lee Chalmers (2015–2016)
 Nathan Pitcock (2017)
 Ace Gonya (2018)

Notable former players
  Andrew Farrell (soccer)
  Napo Matsoso
  Two-Boys Gumede
  Trey Muse
  Chris Hubbard (soccer)
  Amar Sejdić
  Paolo DelPiccolo
  Richard Ballard
  Aleksi Pahkasalo
  Matias Pyysalo
  Haji Abdikadir
  Serge Gomis
  Yudai Tashiro
  Brooks Thompson (soccer)
  Alejandro García (soccer, born 1994)

Stadium

Centurion Soccer Fields, Louisville, Kentucky (2011-2014)
 Woehrle Athletic Complex, Jeffersonville, Indiana (2014–2017)
 King Louie's Sports Complex, Louisville, Kentucky (2018)

See also
 Sports in Louisville, Kentucky

References

External links
 
 Official PDL site

 
Soccer clubs in Kentucky
Association football clubs established in 2010
Association football clubs disestablished in 2018
USL League Two teams
2010 establishments in Kentucky
Sports teams in Louisville, Kentucky